Bournazel is the name of the following communes in France:

 Bournazel, Aveyron, in the Aveyron department
 Bournazel, Tarn, in the Tarn department

People with the surname 
 Pierre-Yves Bournazel (born 1977), Frenchgs politician